Sclerobunus robustus is a species of harvestman that occurs in the western United States, including Arizona, Colorado, New Mexico, and Utah. The species formerly consisted of three subspecies, two of which (S. glorietus and S. idahoensis) were elevated to full species status in 2014.

References

Harvestmen
Arachnids of North America
Taxa named by Alpheus Spring Packard
Animals described in 1877